Edward Jordan Dimock (January 4, 1890 – March 17, 1986) was a United States district judge of the United States District Court for the Southern District of New York.

Education and career

Born in Elizabeth, New Jersey, Dimock received an Artium Baccalaureus degree from Yale University in 1911. At Yale, he was an editor of campus humor magazine The Yale Record. He received a Bachelor of Laws from Harvard Law School in 1914. He was in private practice in New York City, New York from 1914 to 1941, and was a lecturer at Yale Law School from 1941 to 1946, and Editor of the Official Law Reports of the State of New York from 1942 to 1945. He was Chairman of the Appeal Board of the Office of Contract Settlement in Washington, D.C. from 1945 to 1948, and continued as a member of that board until 1951.

Federal judicial service

On June 11, 1951, Dimock was nominated by President Harry S. Truman to a seat on the United States District Court for the Southern District of New York vacated by Judge George Murray Hulbert. Dimock was confirmed by the United States Senate on July 10, 1951, and received his commission on July 11, 1951. He was a member of the Judicial Conference of the United States from 1958 to 1959. He assumed senior status on July 28, 1961. Dimock served in that capacity until his death on March 17, 1986, in Forestburgh, New York.

References

Sources

External links
 

1890 births
1986 deaths
Yale University alumni
Harvard Law School alumni
Judges of the United States District Court for the Southern District of New York
United States district court judges appointed by Harry S. Truman
20th-century American judges